Caroline Felizitas of Leiningen-Dagsburg-Falkenburg (22 May 1734 – 8 May 1810) was a German Imperial countess. By birth, she was member of the House of Leiningen and by marriage member of the House of Nassau.

Early life
She was born in Heidesheim, as the youngest daughter of Count Christian Karl Reinhard of Leiningen-Dagsburg-Falkenburg and his wife, Countess Katherina Polyxena of Solms-Rödelheim and Assenheim (1702-1765).

Marriage and issue 
She married Charles William, Prince of Nassau-Usingen, son of Charles, Prince of Nassau-Usingen and Princess Christiane Wilhelmine of Saxe-Eisenach, on 16 April 1760.

They had 4 children: 
 Karl Wilhelm (26 March 1761 - 10 March 1763).
 Karoline Polyxena (4 April 1762 - 17 August 1823).
 Luise Henriette Karoline (14 June 1763 - 30 March 1845).
 A son (9 March 1768 - March 1768).

Caroline died in Frankfurt.

Ancestry

References

1734 births
1810 deaths
18th-century German people
18th-century German women
19th-century German people
19th-century German women
German countesses
People from Heidenheim